Jilib (other names: Gilib, Gelib, Jillib, Jilib Gosha) is a city in Middle Jubba Region in Somalia, It is  north of Kismaayo.

History
During the Middle Ages, Jilib and its surrounding area was part of the Ajuran Empire that governed much of southern Somalia and eastern Ethiopia, with its domain extending from Hobyo in the north, to Qelafo in the west, to Kismayo in the south.

In the early modern period, Jilib was ruled by the Geledi Sultanate. The kingdom was eventually incorporated into Italian Somaliland protectorate in 1910 after the death of the last Sultan Osman Ahmed. After independence in 1960, the city was made the center of the official Jilib District.

The Islamic Courts Union was defeated there in the Battle of Jilib December 2006 January 2007. The ICU recaptured the town on May 17, 2008.

The town is mosly inhabited by Sheekhaals since they are masters in agricultural facilities and Economically.
but there are some minor clans living in the town such as somali bantu communites in region.

Jilib is currently under control of Al-Shabaab since their beginning.

The city has a National Park called Jilib national park. It is the largest national park in the Middle Juba region of Somalia, at around 950km square kilometres in area.

Somali Civil War

Jilib is controlled by Al-Shabaab, a jihadist fundamentalist group based in East Africa with links to Al-Qaeda. The town functions as its de facto headquarters in Somalia.

References

Populated places in Middle Juba